Eraclea is a small city and comune in the Metropolitan City of Venice, Veneto, northern Italy. It is located on the Adriatic coast between the towns of Caorle and Jesolo.

History
From its founding until 742 AD, the Republic of Venice had its capital based in Eraclea. It was replaced by Malamocco. According to Greek mythology, it was founded by Heracles (Hercules).

Tourism 
Eraclea Mare is, together with Jesolo and Caorle, one of the main seaside resorts on the Venetian coast facing the Adriatic Sea. A steady growth of foreign tourists, especially from Germany, has been recently recorded.

Environment
In 2009, Eraclea Mare was awarded the "3 Sails" by the environmental NGO Legambiente. The city has been awarded the "Blue Flag" from the Foundation for Environmental Education every year from 2007-2017 for the cleanliness of its beaches and seawater.

Main sights 
Eraclea Mare is known for its pinewood and the "Lagoon of the Dead" (Venetian language: Laguna del Mort). The Lagoon, an unusual natural formation, was caused by the overflowing of the Piave river in 1935, whose bed was modified in its last stretch after a large flood. The Lagoon stretches between the Eraclea's Lido and the mouth of the Piave river and it is a sea-lagoon, being supplied with water only by the flood-tides. Still uncontaminated, the Mort is characterized by shallow and calm waters with a sandy and muddy seabed, rich in phytoplankton.

Economy
The city's economy is mostly based on agriculture and tourism, because of its 6 km-long beach (Eracleamare).

Transportation
The town is served by Trenitalia services to Venice and Trieste from San Donà di Piave, and by Venice Marco Polo Airport and Treviso Airport to the west and south, respectively.

By road, Eraclea is accessible from Venice via the A4 through San Donà di Piave to the north.

People
Paolo Lucio Anafesto, first Doge of Venice (697–717)
Marcello Tegalliano, second Doge of Venice (717–726)
Orso Ipato, third Doge of Venice (726–737)
Angelo Participazio, (811-827), 10th Doge of Venice
Saint Floriano bishop of Oderzo with sede in Eraclea (...-620?)
Saint Tiziano bishop of Oderzo with sede in Eraclea (620?-16 January 632?)
Saint Magno, first bishop of Eraclea (632?-638?)
Angelo Correr, bishop of Eraclea (1406-1410) (Pope Gregorio XII)
Giovanni Contarini, bishop of Eraclea (1427)
Nello Santin, footballer (1946)

References

External links

EracleaTravel InfoTourist Information about Eracleamare. 
Eracleamare's Portal Non-profit portal with some information and utilities about Eraclea Mare.
(Google Maps)
 Eracleamare in Flickr
Eracleamare's Blog Blog with some Touristic information and utilities.

Map
  Eraclea on Wikimapia

Webcams
Webcam live service on Eraclea's beach Free provided by Eracleamare.net

Capitals of former nations
Cities and towns in Veneto
Catholic titular sees in Europe
Articles containing video clips